Pterynotus martinetana, common name : the fenestrate murex, is a species of sea snail, a marine gastropod mollusk in the family Muricidae, the murex snails or rock snails.

Description
The size of an adult shell varies between 18 mm and 55 mm.

Distribution
This species is found in the Red Sea and in the Pacific Ocean along Hawaii and the Ryukyus, Japan.

References

External links
 

martinetana
Gastropods described in 1798